This article lists the complete results of the group stage of the 2012 BWF World Junior Championships – Teams event in Chiba, Japan.

Group W1

Japan vs Philippines

Turkey vs Philippines

Japan vs Turkey

Group W2

Thailand vs Bulgaria

India vs Finland

Thailand vs Finland

India vs Bulgaria

Thailand vs India

Finland vs Bulgaria

Group X1

South Korea vs Uzbekistan

Singapore vs Belgium

South Korea vs Belgium

Singapore vs Uzbekistan

South Korea vs Singapore

Belgium vs Uzbekistan

Group X2

Chinese Taipei vs Czech Republic

Russia vs Australia

Chinese Taipei vs Australia

Russia vs Czech Republic

Chinese Taipei vs Russia

Australia vs Czech Republic

Group Y1

Malaysia vs Ukraine

France vs Vietnam

Malaysia vs Vietnam

France vs Ukraine

Malaysia vs France

Vietnam vs Ukraine

Group Y2

Indonesia vs Canada

Netherlands vs Rep. Ireland

Indonesia vs Rep. Ireland

Netherlands vs Canada

Indonesia vs Netherlands

Group Z1

China vs Sri Lanka

England vs Sri Lanka

China vs England

Group Z2

Hong Kong vs USA

Germany vs South Africa

Hong Kong vs South Africa

Germany vs USA

Hong Kong vs Germany

South Africa vs USA

References

2012 BWF World Junior Championships
2012 in youth sport